Hydaspitherium is an extinct genus of giraffid artiodactyls.

Giraffids are represented in the late Miocene of the Siwaliks by large Sivatheriinae such as Sivatherium, Bramatherium, Helladotherium, and Hydaspitherium.   Hydapitherium has been proposed to be synonymous with Bramatherium.  H. megacephalum is restricted to  the Dhok Pathan Formation (paleocoordinates ) in northern Pakistan.

Four separate species of Hydaspitherium were described more than a century ago, but  concluded that their differences can be explained as sexual dimorphism and intraspecific variability: H. birmanicum is based on a single right upper molar.  H. grande and H. magnum (Pilgrim 1910) are only slightly larger than H. megacephalum and the variation in dentition does not support separate taxa.  Bhatti et al. 2012 accepted two species in the Siwaliks: the smaller H. megacephalum and the larger H. grande until more material has been collected.

Notes

References

 
 
 

Prehistoric giraffes
Prehistoric even-toed ungulate genera
Extinct mammals of Asia
Miocene even-toed ungulates